The 2015 African Judo Championships were the 36th edition of the African Judo Championships, and were held in Libreville, Gabon from 23 to 26 April 2015.

Medal overview

Men

Women

Medals table

References

External links
 
 Results

Africa
African Judo Championships
Judo Championships, 2015
Judo Championships